Iarbas (or Hiarbas) was a Roman mythological character, who has appeared in works by various authors including Ovid and Virgil. The character is possibly based on a historical king of Numidia. 

In Roman mythology, Iarbas was the son of Jupiter Hammon (Hammon was a North African god associated by the Romans with Jupiter, and known for his oracle) and a Garamantian nymph. He became the king of Getulia. According to Virgil's Aeneid, he was a suitor for the Carthaginian queen Dido, who rejected his advances.

Variations of the story were referred to by Ovid.  In Ovid's Heroides, Dido describes Iarbas as one of her suitors, to whom Aeneas would be handing her over as a captive if he should leave her.  In Ovid's Fasti, Iarbas and the Numidians invade Dido's land after her suicide, resulting in his capturing her palace.

Macrobius, and Pompeius Trogus also tell versions of the myth; in Justin's epitome of Pompeius he is king of the Muxitani.

Iarbas is briefly referenced in Dante's Purgatorio as owning part of the land south of Italy. Iarbas is also a character in Christopher Marlowe's play Dido, Queen of Carthage.

References 

Characters in the Aeneid
Kingdom of Numidia
Africa in Roman mythology
Children of Zeus